is a professional Japanese baseball player. He plays pitcher for the Saitama Seibu Lions.

Takahashi was a member of the Melbourne Aces of the Australian Baseball League for the 2017-18 season.

External links

 NPB.com

1997 births
Living people
Baseball people from Gunma Prefecture
Nippon Professional Baseball pitchers
Saitama Seibu Lions players
Melbourne Aces players
Japanese expatriate baseball players in Australia